Moline is an unincorporated community in Lampasas and Mills counties in the U.S. state of Texas. According to the Handbook of Texas, the community had a population of 12 in 2000. It is located within the Killeen-Temple-Fort Hood metropolitan area.

History
Moline was first settled in 1884, with the first home being built by Jack Cook. A combination blacksmith shop/corn mill was built here, then another mill was built by a Mr. Robinson. The community may have been named for Moline, Illinois, where some of the early settlers came from, or was given at a meeting held at the blacksmith shop and was acquired from the label on a plow that was for sale. Jack Bullock built a cotton gin in Moline in the early 1900s, causing more residents and new businesses to relocate here. A post office was established at Moline in 1910 in J.W. Trussell's store, with him serving as the postmaster. A doctor surnamed Hicks built a medical office with a drugstore and an emergency operating room. A Methodist church was established by a Mr. Patterson. Then, two more churches for the Baptist and Church of Christ congregations were built. The first cars came in the early 1920s. Jim Tom Brown built a garage where the old blacksmith shop stood. Its population was 35 in 1930 and had three stores and two churches. Five years later, the community got a home economics building and an agricultural shop. The population grew to 100 in the early 1940s. The post office closed in 1976 and the community also had two stores that same decade. Income was driven mainly by farming and livestock raising in the 1980s. The population went down to 60 in 1949, 40 from 1970 to the early 1990s, and 12 in 2000.

Geography

Education
A one-room school building was erected 2 ½ miles south of Moline and was soon replaced by a larger building. It continued to operate in 1930 and had a house for educators five years later. Declining enrollment caused the school to join the schools in Lometa and Star in 1943. It continued to be used as a community center. Today, the community is served by the Star Independent School District.

References

Unincorporated communities in Mills County, Texas
Unincorporated communities in Lampasas County, Texas
Unincorporated communities in Texas